Jakub Ciężki was born in 1979 in Lublin, Poland. He graduated from the Faculty of Arts at the Maria Curie-Skłodowska University in Lublin, in 2003; He was granted an honors degree in the painting atelier of Prof. Jacek Wojciechowski. Ciężki is a painter fascinated with street furniture along with realistic abstractions. He is attracted by the industrial landscape. 

Jakub Ciężki explains his works:“My paintings are a reflection of reality. My abstract ideas come from the natural things that surround me and are represented in a realistic manner, in contrast to the monochromatic flat background. The architectural compositions create a kind of tension between realism and abstraction, my paintings reflect what interests me most in art: material and construction”.

Prizes and scholarships 
 

2015

President of Lublin scholarship

"Polityka’s Passport 2014” application (category: visual art)

2013

Minister of Culture scholarship-holder in “Young Poland 2013” scholarship program

2012

“Polityka’s Passport 2012” application (category: visual art)

2011

“Polityka’s Passport 2011” application (category: visual art)

President of Lublin honours for achievements in arts

40th Painting Biennale “Bielska Jesień 2011” – Grand Prix

40th Painting Biennale “Bielska Jesień 2011” – Artinfo.pl and Artluk editorial staff honours

2006

Autograph 2005 – I prize

2005

“Painting of the Year” Art&Business Competition – finalist

2004

Franciszka Eibisch’s Foundation Competition – Grand Prix

Lublin Province Marshal scholarship

Autograph 2003 – I prize of UMCS rector and II regular prize

2003

Rector’s prize for the best diploma of the UMCS Faculty of Arts

Solo exhibitions and events  

2015

Corporal Punishments, Propaganda, Warsaw / Poland

I Love You but I’ve Chosen Darkness, BWA Gallery, Gorzów Wielkopolski / Poland

2014

Blackout, Baltic Gallery of Contemporary Art, Ustka / Poland

2013

Geometry Lesson, National Museum, Kielce / Poland

Blackout, Bielska Gallery BWA, Bielsko-Biała / Poland

Blackout, Lublin Society for the Encouragement of Fine Arts, Lublin / Poland

Birthday (event with Tomasz Kulka, Polish sculptor), Propaganda, Warsaw / Poland

2012

Haven’t We Met Before?, Propaganda, Warsaw / Poland

Genre Scenes (exhibition with Tomasz Kulka, Polish sculptor), Propaganda, Warsaw / Poland

2010

To Read Between the Lines, Sanok BWA, Sanok / Poland

2009

To Read Between the Lines, Lublin Society for the Encouragement of Fine Arts, Lublin / Poland

2007

Painting, Olympia Gallery, Cracow / Poland

Funnily, Promotion Gallery, Warsaw / Poland

2005

Quiddity, Promotion Gallery, Warsaw / Poland

Painting, ES Gallery, Międzyrzec Podlaski / Poland

Painting, Podlaska Gallery, Biała Podlaska / Poland

2003

Painting, “Under the Floor” ZPAP Gallery, Lublin / Poland

References 

1979 births
Living people
Polish painters
Polish male painters